New Lots Reformed Church and Cemetery is a historic Dutch Reformed church and cemetery at 630 New Lots Avenue in East New York, Brooklyn, New York. It was built in 1823–1824 and is a small, rectangular wood-frame building sheathed in clapboard.  It has a pitched gable roof and sits on a rough stone foundation.  Adjacent to the church is the cemetery divided into two sections.  The older section dates to the 17th century and includes burials of Revolutionary War soldiers and slaves.  The present cemetery was established in 1841.

It was listed on the National Register of Historic Places in 1983.

References

External links
 

Churches in Brooklyn
Dutch-American culture in New York City
Dutch Reformed Church buildings
Properties of religious function on the National Register of Historic Places in Brooklyn
Cemeteries in Brooklyn
New York City Designated Landmarks in Brooklyn
Protestant Reformed cemeteries
Federal architecture in New York City
Churches completed in 1824
Reformed churches in New York City
1824 establishments in New York (state)